Afon Tâf High School is an 11–16 mixed secondary school in Troed-y-rhiw, Merthyr Tydfil, Merthyr Tydfil County Borough, Wales.

Afon Tâf is the Welsh language name of the River Taff which flows past the school.

History 
Built a cost of around £750,000 the school opened in September 1967. Pupils from Quakers Yard Grammar School, Troedyrhiw Secondary School and the Pantglas Senior School in Aberfan transferred to the school.

The whole school was renovated between 2014 and 2017, as a cost of £12 million. The project was undertaken in stages to minimise the impact on the work of the school.

Notable alumni 
 Steve Speirs
 Huw Lewis
 Cameron Coxe

References

External links 
 
 Old Merthyr Tydfil: Afon Tâf School - Historical photographs of Afon Tâf School.

Secondary schools in Merthyr Tydfil County Borough
Educational institutions established in 1967
1967 establishments in Wales